Government College for Women, M.A. Road, Srinagar (Urdu;) commonly known as Women's College Srinagar is located on 8.5 acre campus in summer Capital of Jammu and Kashmir, Srinagar near Lal Chowk opposite SP College. It was founded in 1950. The college is affiliated to Cluster University of Srinagar, recognized by UGC and accredited with ‘A’ grade by NAAC.

Establishment 
The Government of Jammu and Kashmir established the college in October 1950, during the reign of the then Prime Minister of Jammu and Kashmir,  Sheikh Mohamad Abdullah.

Overview 
Women's College Srinagar is in central Srinagar. The college is affiliated with the Cluster University of Srinagar and UGC under 2(f) and 12(b) of UGC Act 1956.

Faculties 
Faculty of Human Development
Faculty of English
Faculty of Sciences
Faculty of Computer Science
Faculty of Social Sciences
Faculty of Humanities, Islamic and Oriental Learning
Faculty of Home Sciences

Degrees offered 
 Bachelor of Science (Medical)
 Bachelor of Science (Non-Medical)
 Bachelor of Science (Home Science)
 Bachelor of Arts
 Bachelor of Arts (Hons) Journalism and Mass Communication.
 Integrated MCA.
 Bachelor of Arts (Hons) English
 Master of Science (Home Science)
 Bachelor of Nursing
 Bachelor of Computer Applications

Awards and achievements 
The National Assessment and Accreditation Council (NAAC)  has accredited the Government College for Women, M A Road, Srinagar, with Grade A.

See also 
 Government College for Women, Nawakadal Srinagar
 Government College for Women, Baramulla

References 

Degree colleges in Kashmir Division
Colleges affiliated to University of Kashmir
Universities and colleges in Srinagar
Women's universities and colleges in Jammu and Kashmir
Colleges affiliated to Cluster University of Srinagar